Stefan Đurić (born 22 May 1995) is a Serbian football forward who plays for Sileks Kratovo in the Macedonian First Football League.

Career
Đurić passed the youth school of Sloboda Užice. As a captain of captain and best scorer of youth team, he moved to Slovakia, and signed four-year contract with Spartak Trnava in summer 2014. He made his debut in Slovak Super Liga, but later played only for the second team, where he scored 2 goals in 12 matches. In summer 2015, he returned to Sloboda Užice.

References

External links
 
 
 

1995 births
Living people
Sportspeople from Užice
Association football forwards
Serbian footballers
Serbian expatriate footballers
Serbian expatriate sportspeople in Slovakia
Expatriate footballers in Slovakia
Serbian expatriate sportspeople in North Macedonia
Expatriate footballers in North Macedonia
FC Spartak Trnava players
FK Sloboda Užice players
FK Jedinstvo Užice players
FK Zlatibor Čajetina players
FK Jagodina players
FK Sileks players
Slovak Super Liga players
2. Liga (Slovakia) players
Serbian SuperLiga players
Macedonian First Football League players